is a union passenger railway station located in the city of Maizuru, Kyoto Prefecture, Japan, operated jointly by the West Japan Railway Company (JR West) and the private railway company Willer Trains (Kyoto Tango Railway).

Lines

Layout
The JR West portion of the station consists of one side platform and one island platform connected by an elevated station building. The station is staffed. The Kyoto Tango Railway portion of the station consists of one dead-headed side platform.

JR West

Kyoto Tango Railway

Adjacent stations

History 
It was renamed on April 1, 1944. The current station building was completed in 1999.

Passenger statistics
In fiscal 2019, the Kyoto Tango Railway portion station was used by an average of 361 passengers daily. The last published data for the JR West portion of the station was 1487 passengers daily in fiscal 2017.

Surrounding area
 Maizuru Castle (Tanabe Castle)
 Maizuru City Hall West Branch
 Kyoto Prefectural Nishi Maizuru High School

See also
List of railway stations in Japan

References

External links

JR West homepage
KTR homepage 

Railway stations in Japan opened in 1904
Railway stations in Kyoto Prefecture
Maizuru